Kathleen Marion Whyatt,  (30 November 1898 – 1969) was an English figure skater. She competed in the mixed pairs event at the 1928 Winter Olympics.

References

1898 births
1969 deaths
Date of death missing
People from Trafford (district)
Sportspeople from Greater Manchester
Olympic figure skaters of Great Britain
Figure skaters at the 1928 Winter Olympics
English female pair skaters